Montagonum is a genus of ground beetles in the family Carabidae. There are about nine described species in Montagonum, found in Indonesia and Papua New Guinea.

Species
These nine species belong to the genus Montagonum:
 Montagonum filiola Darlington, 1971
 Montagonum fugitum Darlington, 1971
 Montagonum major Baehr, 2012
 Montagonum minor Baehr, 2012
 Montagonum nepos Darlington, 1971
 Montagonum pandum Darlington, 1971
 Montagonum riedeli Baehr, 2008
 Montagonum sororcula Darlington, 1971
 Montagonum toxopeanum Darlington, 1952

References

Platyninae